Robert Francis Christian, O.P. (December 2, 1948 – July 11, 2019) was an American prelate of the Catholic Church and served as auxiliary bishop for the Archdiocese of San Francisco.

Biography
Bishop Christian was a member of the Dominican Order. On June 4, 1976, Christian was ordained to the priesthood. This followed a long teaching career, mainly at the Angelicum in Rome. Pope Francis appointed Christian auxiliary bishop for the Archdiocese of San Francisco on March 28, 2018.  On June 5, 2018, Christian was consecrated as a bishop. The Archdiocese of San Francisco announced on January 14, 2019, that Christian had been appointed Rector-President of St. Patrick Seminary. He died in his sleep on July 11, 2019, at St. Patrick's Seminary in Menlo Park, California.

See also
 

 Catholic Church hierarchy
 Catholic Church in the United States
 Historical list of the Catholic bishops of the United States
 List of Catholic bishops of the United States
 Lists of patriarchs, archbishops, and bishops

References

External links
 

1948 births
2019 deaths
People from San Francisco
20th-century Roman Catholic bishops in the United States
Catholics from California
Dominican bishops
Bishops appointed by Pope Francis
21st-century Roman Catholic bishops in the United States